Abdulrahman Hassan Abdullah (born 14 September 1977) is a Qatari middle-distance runner. He competed in the men's 800 metres at the 1996 Summer Olympics.

References

External links

1977 births
Living people
Place of birth missing (living people)
Qatari male middle-distance runners
Olympic male middle-distance runners
Olympic athletes of Qatar
Athletes (track and field) at the 1996 Summer Olympics
Asian Games bronze medalists for Qatar
Asian Games medalists in athletics (track and field)
Athletes (track and field) at the 1994 Asian Games
Athletes (track and field) at the 1998 Asian Games
Medalists at the 1998 Asian Games